Don Andrew Moore (born 1970) is an author, academic, and professor. He is the Lorraine Tyson Mitchell Chair I of Leadership and Communication at UC Berkeley's Haas School of Business where he teaches classes on leadership, negotiation, and decision making.

Education 

Moore attended Carleton College, graduating in 1993 with a degree in psychology. He earned master's (1998) and doctoral degrees (2000) from the Kellogg Graduate School of Management, Northwestern University.

Career 
Moore is currently a professor at UC Berkeley's Haas School of Business where he has been on faculty since 2010.  He is the Associate Dean for Academic Affairs at Haas.  From 2014-2020, he was faculty director of UC Berkeley's Xlab. Prior to that, he taught at Carnegie Mellon University, Tepper School of Business from 2000 until 2010. 

Moore is primarily known for his work in behavioral economics, with a focus on decision making and overconfidence.

He was among the co-leaders of the Good Judgment Project, a forecasting tournament that predicted geopolitical events.  The project was sponsored by the U.S. government's Intelligence Advanced Research Projects Activity (IARPA).

He has published two books: Judgment and Managerial Decision Making, co-authored with Max Bazerman, as well as Perfectly Confident: How to Calibrate Your Decisions Wisely.

References 

1970 births
Living people
Northwestern University alumni
Carleton College alumni
University of California, Berkeley faculty
21st-century American non-fiction writers